Thomas Adamson may refer to:

 Thomas Adamson (master gunner) (died 1685), English Army officer and military writer
 Thomas Adamson (soldier) (1845–1913), New Zealand soldier and farmer
 Thomas Adamson (priest) (1901–1991), domestic prelate to the Pope and Vicar-General of Liverpool 
 Tom Adamson (1901–?), footballer
 Tommy Adamson, Scottish footballer